was the nephew of Itakura Katsuaki. He was the eighth and last Itakura Daimyō of Bitchū-Matsuyama-han.

Family
 Father: Itakura Katsutaka
 Mother: Ishida clan's daughter
 Wife: Ōta Sukekatsu’s daughter
 Concubine: Morishima clan's daughter
 Children:
 Itakura Katsunori
 Itakura Katsusada
 Itakura Katsunobu (1897-1923)
 Masuko married Makino Tadaatsu

Title

Daimyo
19th-century Japanese people

References 

1846 births
1896 deaths